Bangramanjeshwar (Bangramanjeshwaram) is a census town in Kasaragod district  in the state of Kerala, India.

Demographics
As of 2011 Census, Bangramanjeshwar town had a population of 5,791 where 2,841 are males and 2,950 are females. Population in the age group below 6 years was 12%. Average literacy rate of Bangramanjeshwar was 92% lower than state average of 94%: male literacy was 96.5% and female literacy was 87.7 %.

Religions
As per 2011 census report, Bangramanjeshwar town has total population of 5,791 among which 3,490 are Muslims (60.3%), 2,238 are Hindus (38.6%), 29 Christians (0.5%), 20 Jains (0.3%), 4 Sikhs and 10 people not stated their religion.

Transportation
Local roads have access to National Highway No.66 which connects to Mangalore in the north and Calicut in the south.  The nearest railway station is Manjeshwar on Mangalore-Palakkad line. There is an airport at Mangalore.

Languages
This locality is an essentially multi-lingual region. The people speak Malayalam,  Tulu, Beary bashe and Konkani And Urdu. Migrant workers also speak Hindi and Tamil languages.

Administration
This village is part of Manjeshwaram assembly constituency which is again part of Kasaragod (Lok Sabha constituency).

History
Manjeshwar got its name from the famous temple Sri Madananteshwar Temple. It used to be a port town for king Bangararasa hence this part of the Manjeshwar was named as Bangramanjeshwar

References

Manjeshwar area
Cities and towns in Kasaragod district